Laura Brooke Winter (born May 17, 1999), known professionally as Elle Winter, is an American singer-songwriter and actress from New York City. After signing with Sony Orchard. In March 2020, she released her debut EP Yeah, No.

Early life 

Laura Brooke Winter was born May 17, 1999, in Manhattan, New York City. She has one older sister, Lizzie. Brought up on the Upper East Side of Manhattan, Winter attended The Trinity School and is currently enrolled at the University of Pennsylvania.

Career

2011–2013: Beginnings and debut 
Winter was discovered by Disney at the age of 12, where she was part of Radio Disney’s Next Big Thing Season 5. She toured the United States on behalf of Radio Disney and released her first two singles with Walt Disney Records, Day Away and Incredible. As a part of the program, Winter’s home life was featured on The Disney Channel (2013)

Acting
Winter got her start in acting with her appearance in Three Generations (2015), starring Elle Fanning and Susan Sarandon, where Winter played Fanning’s love interest. Winter has subsequently appeared in other films including Code Red (2016) and The After Party (2018)

Music 
In 2018, Winter independently released the single "One More” that resulted in a performance spot on The Today Show. That same year, Winter was named Elvis Duran's Artist of the Month as well as KIIS FM  LA's Next Up Artist. In the beginning of 2019, Winter signed with Sony’s RED MUSIC. She released her debut EP in 2020, titled "Yeah, No." and dropped a music video to the title track.

In March 2020, Winter released her debut EP Yeah, No,  which she worked on with production team The Orphanage. The EP featured the singles “Sick Of You” and “Do You,” both of which were released in 2019  The same day she released the EP, she released the music video for the title track of the EP.

References

External links 
 

1999 births
Sony Music artists
21st-century American women singers
American women singer-songwriters
21st-century American actresses
Actresses from New York City
Singers from New York City
Living people
21st-century American singers
Singer-songwriters from New York (state)